Fuat Yıldız (born 1 April 1965) is a Turkish-born German wrestler. He competed in the men's Greco-Roman 48 kg at the 1992 Summer Olympics.

References

External links
 

1965 births
Living people
German male sport wrestlers
German people of Turkish descent
Olympic wrestlers of Germany
Wrestlers at the 1992 Summer Olympics
Sportspeople from Kars